Drop-In was a Canadian television series for youth broadcast on CBC Television from 28 September 1970 to 1974. Various hosts were featured throughout the course of the series to present a variety of topics.

The show was broadcast three times per week in the 1970–1971 season. This was increased to four times per week in the following year.

Dress Rehearsal 
Prior to the fall launch of the series, eight preview episodes were aired on CBC Television beginning 7 July 1970. These were entitled Dress Rehearsal, but otherwise featured hosts such as Susan Conway, Lynne Griffin, Nina Keogh, and Rex Hagon, who would be seen on the regular series from that October. Conway and Hagon had previously appeared together as child actors on the Canadian dramatic television series "The Forest Rangers".

The first season was taped entirely in Toronto. For its second and subsequent seasons Drop In's format changed to one where episodes were produced locally in several Canadian cities, with local children as hosts.

Hosts 
Partial list of hosts, who appeared with inconsistent frequency throughout the series:

 Jeffrey Cohen
 Susan Conway
 Lynne Griffin
 Rex Hagon
 Nina Keogh
 Pat Rose
 Jeannie Wright  
 Tommy Wright

References

External links 
 Queen's University Directory of CBC Television Series: Drop-In
Queen's University Directory of CBC Television Series: Dress Rehearsal
 

1970 Canadian television series debuts
1974 Canadian television series endings
CBC Television original programming
1970s Canadian children's television series